Elections to Hertfordshire County Council took place on 6 May 2021 alongside other local elections in the United Kingdom. All 78 seats to the council were elected.

The Conservative Party won 46 of the 78 seats, winning a majority and thus retaining control of the council, despite making a net loss of five seats, with leader David Williams losing his seat of Harpenden North East. Deputy Leader of the Council Teresa Heritage became acting leader in the aftermath of the election, and Cllr Richard Roberts was ratified as Leader of the Council on 25 May 2021.

Background 

In the 2017 election, the Conservative Party held overall control of the council, winning 51 of the 78 seats. The Liberal Democrats were the second largest party with 18 seats. The Labour Party won 9 seats.

Several by-elections took place between the 2017 and 2021 elections:

Roma Mills, councillor for St Albans North, resigned from the Labour Party in April 2020 after Keir Starmer was elected Leader of the Labour Party, citing her disagreement with his changes in policies. Andrew Stevenson, councillor for Hertford All Saints, resigned from the Conservative Party in December 2020 due to his opposition to the two-tier local government structure in Hertfordshire and having failed to be reselected by the Hertford and Stortford Conservatives.

As a result, the Conservatives had 49 councillors and 2 councillors sat as independents, giving the Conservatives a majority of 20 before the 2021 election.

In the 2019 general election, the Liberal Democrats won St Albans for the first time since the party's formation, defeating the incumbent Conservative Member of Parliament.

Campaign

Environment

The Conservatives pledged to achieve carbon neutrality by 2050, and that by 2030, Hertfordshire County Council would be carbon-neutral and waste would no longer be sent to landfill.

The Liberal Democrats pledged to achieve carbon neutrality by 2030 by introducing solar powered lighting on walking and cycling routes, and a £2.5 million fund for charging stations for electric vehicles.

Local government structure

In 2020, Leader of the Council David Williams advocated merging Hertfordshire County Council and the ten district councils into a single unitary authority. Hertfordshire County Council suggested that the proposal could save £140 million per year.

Labour committed to opposing any plans for a Hertfordshire unitary authority.

Transport

Labour supported an increase in the number of late night buses, and would reinstate bus subsidies. The party also supported the reopening of a passing loop on the Abbey Line to increase the railway's capacity, and would push for Oyster card functionality for railway stations close to London. Leader of the Labour group Judi Billing stated that she believed that a 20 mph speed limit should be the default on roads in Hertfordshire.

The Green Party and the Liberal Democrats also supported the introduction of a default 20 mph speed limit on residential roads.

Procedure

The elections were held during the COVID-19 pandemic in the United Kingdom. Hertfordshire County Council advised that the ballot boxes should not be opened for 24 hours after the polls closed to prevent the spread of COVID-19. The Borough of Broxbourne began counting the votes on 7 May, while the other nine districts of Hertfordshire began counting on 8 May. Some districts also opted to not count the votes for the district council elections until 9 May to reduce the number of people required to be present, and make social distancing easier.

Summary

Election result

|-

The Conservatives won 46 of the 78 seats, remaining in control of the council and giving them a majority of 14, despite making a net loss of five seats. The Liberal Democrats remained the second-largest party, winning 23 seats, the highest number of seats since the party's formation. The Greens won a seat for the first time since the 2009 election.

Results by division

Broxbourne 

The election was held alongside an election to Broxbourne Borough Council.

Dacorum

East Hertfordshire

Hertsmere

North Hertfordshire 

The election was held alongside an election to North Hertfordshire District Council.

St Albans 

The election was held alongside an election to St Albans City and District Council.

The St Albans North division had been gained by Labour in a 2018 by-election.

Stevenage 

The election was held alongside an election to Stevenage Borough Council.

Three Rivers 

The election was held alongside an election to Three Rivers District Council.

The Three Rivers Rural division had previously been gained by the Liberal Democrats in a 2018 by-election.

Watford 

The election was held alongside an election to Watford Borough Council.

Welwyn Hatfield 

The election was held alongside an election to Welwyn Hatfield Borough Council.

By-elections

Hitchen South

References 

Hertfordshire County Council elections
Hertfordshire County Council
2020s in Hertfordshire